Chlorphenesin carbamate (Maolate, Musil) is a centrally acting muscle relaxant used to treat muscle pain and spasms. Chlorphenesin is no longer used for this purpose in most developed nations due to the availability of much safer spasmolytics such as benzodiazepines. 

Other central effects include sedation, anxiolysis, and dizziness. It also has antifungal and some antibacterial properties and is thus classified as an antifungal for topical use by the WHO.

Safety
The major adverse effect from this preservative on skin is allergic contact sensitivity. Systemic intoxication from transdermal use has not been observed, although the FDA discourages its use as an ingredient in nipple cream for nursing mothers.

References 

Muscle relaxants
Carbamates
Secondary alcohols
Phenol ethers
Chloroarenes
Drugs with unknown mechanisms of action
Glycerols